Baggalútur is an Icelandic musical band. The band performs original songs. popular Icelandic songs and Icelandic renditions of international hits from various genres. Baggalútur also performs on annual Christmas celebrations.

Their album Mamma þarf að djamma topped the Icelandic charts throughout November and December 2013; including the Christmas chart. The title track "Mamma þarf að djamma"  featuring the vocals of Jóhanna Guðrún  was number 1 in the Icelandic Singles Charts,  Tónlist, 13 consecutive weeks. At the time it was the largest selling single for 2013.

Members
Bragi Valdimar Skúlason
Guðmundur Kristinn Jónsson
Guðmundur Pálsson
Karl Sigurðsson
Garðar Þorsteinn Guðgeirsson
Haraldur Hallgrímsson
Jóhann Bragi Fjalldal

Discography

Albums
2005: Pabbi þarf að vinna
2006: Aparnir í Eden
2006: Jól og blíða
2008: Nýjasta nýtt
2009: Sólskinið í Dakota 
2010: Næstu jól 
2010: Síðustu jól - Jólatónleikar Baggalúts 2009
2011: Áfram Ísland!
2011: Crazy Fast Icelandic Banjo Picking Frenzy
2013: Mamma þarf að djamma
2015: Jólaland

Singles
2001: "Gleðileg jól"
2003: "Áfram Ísland"
2004: "Kósíheit par exelans"
2005: "Pabbi þarf að vinna í nótt"
2005: "Sagan af Jesúsi"
2006: "Allt fyrir mig"
2006: "Gamlárspartý"
2007: "Sof þú mér hjá"
2007: "Ísland, ég elska þig"
2008: "Kósíkvöld í kvöld"
2008: "Þjóðhátíð '93"
2008: "Það koma vonandi jól"
2009: "Saman við á ný"
2009: "Þetta er búið"
2010: "Gærkvöldið"
2011: "Ónáðið ekki"
2011: "Lesbískar ninjavampírur á flótta"
2012: "Heims um bóleró"
2013: "Mamma þarf að djamma" (with Jóhanna Guðrún)
2013: "Allt"
2013: "Ég fell bara fyrir flugfreyjum"
2014: "Inni í eyjum"
2014: "Kalt á toppnum" (with Prins Póló)
2015: "Nú mega jólin fara fyrir mér"
2017: "Grenja" (with Salka Sól)
2017: "Stúfur" (with Friðrik Dór)

References

External links
Baggalútur band Facebook
News website

Icelandic pop music groups